François Bourgade  (born 7 July 1806 in Gaujan, died 21 May 1866 in Paris) was a French missionary and philosopher. He was one of the first French missionaries to Muslim North Africa, serving in present-day Algeria and Tunisia.

Bourgade pursued his theological studies at the seminary of Auch and was ordained priest in 1832. His immediate request to be authorized to work among the infidels of Africa was granted only in 1838. He proceeded to Algeria and, after ministering for some time in the hospitals of this colony, passed over to the regency of Tunis, where he founded a hospital and several schools. He was put in charge of the chapel which Louis Philippe (1830–1848) had erected on the spot where St. Louis died, and he received several decorations, among them the Legion of Honour. The chief object of his literary productions was to spread the knowledge of Christianity among the Mohammedans.

Books published
La Clef Du Coran (1852), faisant suite aux Soirées De Carthage (1847), Reprinted by the Nabu Press (2010) 
Passage du Coran (1855)
La Toison d'Or de la Langue Phénicienne (1852, 1856)
Lettre à M. E. Renan à l’Occasion de Son Ouvrage Intitulé Vie de Jésus, Martin-Beaupré Frères (1864)

References

1806 births
1866 deaths
19th-century French Roman Catholic priests
French Roman Catholic missionaries
Clergy from Paris
Roman Catholic missionaries in Algeria
Roman Catholic missionaries in Tunisia
People from Gers